John "Johnny" Miles (June 12, 1923 – May 17, 2006) was an American actor who appeared in 19 movies between 1944 and 1950.

Miles played the lead in his last film The Tattooed Stranger (1950), a film noir shot on location in New York City.  His other roles consist mainly of small supporting parts in films like Gunfighters (1947), based upon a Zane Grey novel with a screenplay by Alan Le May, and the B-picture The Fabulous Texan (1947) starring Wild Bill Elliott, John Carroll, Catherine McLeod, and Andy Devine.

Filmography 
 Wing and a Prayer (1944; uncredited)
 Three Is a Family (1944; uncredited)
 Roughly Speaking (1945; uncredited)
 Hotel Berlin (1945; uncredited)
 God Is My Co-Pilot (1945; uncredited)
 Pillow to Post (1945; uncredited)
 Pride of the Marines (1945; uncredited)
 Star in the Night (1945)
 Too Young to Know (1946)
 San Antonio (1946; uncredited)
 Janie Gets Married (1946; uncredited)
 Night and Day (1946; uncredited)
 Gunfighters (1947)
 The Hal Roach Comedy Carnival (1947)
 The Fabulous Joe (1947)
 The Fabulous Texan (1947)
 The Babe Ruth Story (1948; uncredited)
 Mother Is a Freshman (1949; uncredited)
 The Tattooed Stranger (1950)

External links
 

1923 births
2006 deaths
American male film actors
20th-century American male actors
Male actors from Philadelphia